Theodore Pease Stearns (1881–1935) was an American composer. Born in Berea, Ohio, he wrote a number of operas. Of these, The Snowbird was given at the Chicago Civic Opera in 1923; this work won the Bispham Memorial Medal Award. He taught music at the University of California, Los Angeles from 1932 until 1935.

References

External links
 
 List of works on son's website
 Biography

1881 births
1935 deaths
American male classical composers
American classical composers
University of California, Los Angeles faculty
American opera composers
People from Berea, Ohio
Classical musicians from Ohio
20th-century American male musicians